The women's 80 metres hurdles  event at the 1936 Summer Olympic Games took place August 5 and August 6.  The final was won by Italian Ondina Valla.

Results

Heats

Heat 1

Heat 2

Heat 3

Heat 4

Semifinals
Heat 1

Heat 2

Final

Key: OR = Olympic record

References

Athletics at the 1936 Summer Olympics
Sprint hurdles at the Olympics
1936 in women's athletics
Ath